The 2023 season is the 98th season in the existence of Barcelona Sporting Club, and the 65th season in the top flight of Ecuadorian football. Barcelona is involved in three competitions: the main national tournament Liga Pro, the national cup called Copa Ecuador, and the international tournament Copa Libertadores.

This season is the fourth one with Carlos Alfaro Moreno as president of the club. Barcelona's coach is Fabian Bustos who returns after departing the club for Santos FC during the previous season.

Competitions

Overall record

LigaPro Serie A

First stage

Stage Table

Results summary

Results by round

Matches

Notes

Second stage

Stage Table

Results summary

Results by round

Matches

Copa Libertadores

Group stage

The group draw is to be held March 22nd.
Barcelona will be selected from pot two.

Statistics

Goalscorers

References 

Barcelona S.C. seasons